Sofiia Larycheva (Ukrainian: Софія Ларичева; born 1 September 1994, Kherson, Ukraine) is a Ukrainian Olympic Sailor, participant of Summer Youth Olympics in Byte CII category, currently sailing women one-person dinghy Olympic class Laser Radial. Winner of Europe Cup 2015.

References

Ukrainian female sailors (sport)
1994 births
Living people
Sailors at the 2010 Summer Youth Olympics
Byte CII class sailors
Sportspeople from Kherson
21st-century Ukrainian women